is a railway station in Kashima, Saga Prefecture, Japan. It is operated by JR Kyushu and is on the Nagasaki Main Line.

Lines

Station layout 
The station consists of a side and an island platform serving three tracks. A siding branches off track 1. The station building is an old timber building of western design and houses a waiting room and a tourist information centre. The station is unstaffed but a ticket window is managed by a Kan'i itaku agent. Only some types of tickets are sold and there is no POS machine. Access to the island platform is by means of a footbridge.

Adjacent stations

History
Japanese Government Railways (JGR) built the station in the 1930s during the development of an alternative route for the Nagasaki Main Line along the coast of the Ariake Sea. In the next phase of expansion, the track was extended to Hizen-Hama which opened as the new southern terminus on 30 November 1930. With the privatization of Japanese National Railways (JNR), the successor of JGR, on 1 April 1987, control of the station passed to JR Kyushu.

Passenger statistics
In fiscal 2016, the daily average number of passengers using the station (boarding passengers only) was above 100 and below 323. The station did not rank among the top 300 busiest stations of JR Kyushu.

Surrounding area
Yūtoku Inari Shrine - Japan's third biggest Inari shrine. Hizen-Hama is the closest station although the previous station  is more convenient for passengers taking a limited express train.
National Route 207

See also
 List of railway stations in Japan

References

External links
Hizen-Hama Station (JR Kyushu)

Nagasaki Main Line
Railway stations in Saga Prefecture
Railway stations in Japan opened in 1930